Saw is a horror franchise created by Australian film makers James Wan and Leigh Whannell, consisting of ten feature films and additional media. Set in an unnamed city in the United States, the first eight films primarily revolve around the fictional serial killer John "Jigsaw" Kramer, while the ninth movie revolves around a copycat killer while still keeping continuity with the previous films. John Kramer was introduced briefly in Saw and developed in more detail in Saw II and the subsequent films. Rather than killing his victims outright, he traps them in life-threatening situations that he calls "tests" or "games" to test their will to survive through physical or psychological torture, believing that if they survive, they will be "rehabilitated". Kramer was killed off in Saw III, but the films continued to focus on his posthumous influence, particularly by his apprentices, and explore his character via flashbacks.

In 2003, Wan and Whannell made a short film to help pitch a potential feature film concept, after having the original script written for several years. After several unsuccessful attempts in their home country of Australia, Wan and Whannell moved to the United States, after several producers expressed interest in the project. It was ultimately successful, and, in 2004, the first installment debuted at the Sundance Film Festival and was released theatrically that October by Lionsgate. After its immensely successful opening weekend, the first of many sequels was immediately green-lit. Five directors have worked on the series: James Wan, Darren Lynn Bousman, David Hackl, Kevin Greutert and The Spierig Brothers; while Whannell, Bousman, Patrick Melton, Marcus Dunstan, Josh Stolberg and Peter Goldfinger have written the scripts. From 2004 to 2010, each film was released on the Friday before Halloween. Both creators remained with the franchise as executive producers.

In 2010, franchise producer Mark Burg said that the seventh film, Saw 3D, would be the final installment. Lionsgate however expressed interest in continuing the franchise in 2012. An eighth film, Jigsaw, was released in October 2017. A ninth film, Spiral, was released in 2021, with comedian and actor Chris Rock as the film’s lead actor.

The film series as a whole has received mostly mixed to negative reviews, but remains one of the highest-grossing horror film franchises of all time. While some critics have called the films, which have acquired a reputation for extreme graphic violence, "torture porn", the franchise's creators, and most of its fans, disagree with that characterization.

Films

Future

A tenth film with a working title of Saw X, is currently in development as of October 2022. The film will be directed by Kevin Greutert who also directed Saw VI and Saw 3D. Josh Stolberg confirmed the script was finished in December of 2021. In October 2022, Tobin Bell was set to reprise the role of John Kramer / Jigsaw for the film. Later in December, Shawnee Smith was "circling" around an offer to reprise her role as Amanda Young. In February 2023, it was confirmed that Shawnee Smith returns as Amanda in Saw X.

Short film

Saw, retrospectively referred to as Saw 0.5, is a 2003 short film that served as a promotional tool in pitching a feature-length version to Lionsgate. It is included on the second disc of the uncut DVD release of Saw. It has also been released alone, and on the Saw Trilogy DVD containing Saw Uncut Edition, Saw II Special Edition, and Saw III Director's Cut, packaged with a limited-edition 3D puppet head box version of Billy the Puppet.

Television
In April 2021, Lionsgate Television chairman Kevin Beggs announced in an interview with Deadline Hollywood that Lionsgate TV is in early talks on a television series adaptation of the film Spiral, from Mark Burg and Oren Koules' Twisted Television.

Recurring cast and characters

Additional crew and production details

Production

Story overview
The series takes place in an unnamed city in the United States. Flashbacks from Saw IV reveal the roots of the series, presenting John Kramer as a successful civil engineer and devoted husband to his wife Jill Tuck, who opened a rehab clinic for drug addicts. Jill lost her unborn baby, Gideon, due to the unwitting actions of a drug addict named Cecil, who fled the scene. Saw VI later showed that another drug addict, Amanda Young, also had an unintentional role in Gideon's death. Grieving the loss of his child, John distanced himself from his friends and wife.

John and Jill eventually drifted apart and divorced. John found himself trapped by his own complacency until he was diagnosed with inoperable cancer. Extremely bitter over his squandered life and the loss of his unborn son, he began observing the lives of others and became even more depressed as he saw them squandering the gift of life that he had just been denied. He approached a man named William Easton for money for an experimental cancer treatment, but was denied. Flashbacks from Saw II show that, after surviving a suicide attempt where he drove his car off a cliff, John was "reborn", and nurtured the idea that the only way for someone to change is for them to change themselves. Then, in Saw IV flashbacks, he designed the first trap and test for Cecil, and decided to use the rest of his existence to design more of these "tests" or "games" as a form of "instant rehabilitation" that would change the world "one person at a time". John was soon given the nickname "The Jigsaw Killer" (or "Jigsaw"), because he removed a puzzle-piece-shaped chunk of flesh from those who did not escape his traps. John stated that this name was given to him by the media, and that the cut piece of flesh represented that the victims were missing what he called the "survival instinct".

Few of John's victims can survive his brutal mechanical traps, which are often ironically symbolic representations of problems in the victim's life and require them to undergo severe physical and/or psychological torture to escape. 

Jigsaw depicts one of John's very first games, which never became public. The only survivor is Logan Nelson, the man who accidentally mislabeled John's x-rays, causing his cancer to go undiagnosed until it was too late. Believing Logan should not die over an honest mistake, John saves him before he is killed by one of the traps, and recruits him as his first apprentice. Logan helps John build several traps for future games, but eventually enlists in the U.S. Army and leaves to fight in the Iraq War. 

In Saw V, police lieutenant Mark Hoffman's ties with John are revealed in a series of flashbacks. During John's first years of activity, Hoffman's sister was murdered by her boyfriend, Seth Baxter. Seth is sentenced to life imprisonment; however, a technicality allows him to go free after only five years. Hoffman then kills him in an inescapable trap designed to resemble a Jigsaw trap; everyone then believes that Jigsaw was behind the killing. John then kidnaps Hoffman and blackmails him into becoming his apprentice in his "rehabilitation" methods. Though initially forced to help, Hoffman later becomes a willing apprentice, and helps set up most of John's tests.

After beating her test, Amanda Young becomes the first known survivor of a Jigsaw game. She comes to see John as a hero who changed her life for the better; and, on John's request, becomes his protégée and next apprentice. John shows her rehabilitation to Jill, who becomes aware of his traps and becomes somewhat of an accomplice as well.

In Saw, John chains the man who diagnosed his cancer, Dr. Lawrence Gordon, in a dilapidated industrial washroom with Adam Stanheight, a photographer who has been tailing the doctor, believing he is cheating on his wife. Lawrence has instructions to kill Adam by six o'clock or his wife and daughter will be killed. Flashbacks show Detectives David Tapp and Steven Sing, who suspect Lawrence of being Jigsaw, following a trail of clues from other Jigsaw traps. Sing's death from a shotgun trap after saving a victim causes Tapp to obsess over catching Jigsaw. Later, he chases Zep Hindle, who monitors Adam and Lawrence's tests, and is shot in the chest. Eventually, Lawrence saws off his own foot to escape, leaving Adam in the bathroom while Lawrence tries to save his family and get help for Adam. It is later seen in Saw 3D that Lawrence found a steaming hot pipe and cauterized his wound, stopping the bleeding and ultimately surviving the trap. John catches up with Lawrence and makes him his next apprentice, a fact he hides from his other accomplices. Flashbacks from Saw III show that Amanda kidnapped Adam and later returned to suffocate him as an act of "mercy killing".

Saw II begins with the police tracking a severely weakened John to his lair. However, another test is in place, as he and Amanda have kidnapped the son of Detective Eric Matthews and trapped him and a group of seven convicts, previously framed by Eric, in a house that is slowly being filled with sarin gas, with Amanda among them. He will trade Daniel Matthews' life for Eric's time, conversing with him until the game is concluded. Eric loses his patience and assaults John, forcing him to take him to the house, only to discover that the video feed from inside the house had been pre-recorded; the events in it actually took place much earlier. Eric's son was locked in a safe in John's warehouse and kept alive with an oxygen tank. Eric is knocked unconscious by a masked figure and wakes up imprisoned in the bathroom from Saw, which is part of the house's foundation. Amanda reveals herself to Eric as John's protégée before leaving him to die. In a flashback from Saw III, Eric manages to escape the bathroom by breaking his foot. He confronts and beats Amanda, demanding to know where his son is. Amanda fights him off and leaves him for dead. A flashback from Saw IV shows Hoffman later dragging Eric to a prison cell, keeping him alive for a future game.

The events of Saw III and Saw IV occur concurrently. Saw III begins with John, weakened and near death, confined to a makeshift hospital bed. Amanda has taken over his work, designing traps of her own; however, these traps are inescapable, as Amanda is convinced that John's traps have no effect and that people don't change. A kidnapped doctor is forced to keep John alive while another test is performed on Jeff Denlon, a man obsessed with vengeance against the drunk driver who killed his son. John, unwilling to allow a murderer to continue his legacy, designs a test for Amanda as well; she ultimately fails, resulting in the deaths of both John and Amanda. Saw IV, meanwhile, revolves around tests meant for Officer Daniel Rigg, which are overseen by Hoffman. Rigg fails his test, resulting in the death of Eric Matthews. Rigg is left to bleed to death by Hoffman, who later discovers the bodies of John and Amanda. When an autopsy is performed on John, a cassette tape coated in wax is found in his stomach; the tape informs Hoffman that he is wrong to think that it is all over just because John is dead, and he should not expect to go untested.

The events of Saw V show Hoffman's first solo test: Five people connected to a disastrous fire that killed several others are put into four interconnected tests of teamwork, killing off one person in each trap. The two remaining test subjects realize at the final trap that each previous trap was meant to be completed by each of the five people doing a small part, rather than killing one person per trap. With this knowledge, they work together and barely manage to escape. They are found alive by Special Agent Dan Erickson. Meanwhile, Hoffman has set up FBI Agent Peter Strahm to appear to be Jigsaw's accomplice, while Strahm pursues Hoffman and is eventually killed due to his inability to follow Hoffman's rules, leaving Hoffman free to continue Jigsaw's "work".

Saw VI begins with Hoffman setting up a game as per John's instructions left in a box for Jill during Saw V. This game centers on health insurance executive William Easton, who oversees a team responsible for rejecting two-thirds of all insurance claims. As William progresses through four tests, he saves as many people as he can and learns the error of his ways, which inherently "kill" the rejected. His last test is a test of forgiveness by the family of Harold Abbott, whom William refused a claim. Harold's son ultimately chooses to kill William with hydrofluoric acid. Meanwhile, Agent Erickson and the previously-thought-dead Agent Lindsey Perez search for Agent Strahm with Hoffman's assistance. Finding irregularities in previous murder scenes, Perez and Erickson discover Hoffman's identity, but he kills them before they can go public with it. Hoffman travels back to the site of Easton's tests, where Jill attacks him to obey John's final request. She leaves him in a new trap John has left behind and does not leave a key for him to free himself. He is able to manipulate the trap and escapes wounded.

Saw 3D picks up with Jill and Hoffman battling for control of John's legacy. As Jill enters protective custody and makes Hoffman's identity public, Hoffman sets up a new game involving skinheads to find a way to Jill. Meanwhile, Bobby Dagen, a fraud who has written a book about escaping a Jigsaw trap he never experienced, is captured and forced to confront people who knew that he lied about being in a trap. Three of Bobby's friends die and his test concludes with him being forced to re-enact the trap he claimed to have escaped. He fails, causing the death of his wife. Meanwhile, Hoffman has posed as a corpse and killed several officers to infiltrate the police station. He finds and kills Jill using the reverse bear trap. Hoffman attempts to leave town but is captured by Dr. Lawrence Gordon and his accomplices, then placed in the bathroom from the first film. John is revealed to have saved Lawrence after his game and, in return, Lawrence helped him with subsequent traps. Lawrence leaves Hoffman shackled in the bathroom to die.

The present-day portion of Jigsaw takes place roughly ten years after John's death in Saw III. When a new Jigsaw game leaves several people dead, the police come to believe that either John has been resurrected, or a Jigsaw copycat is involved. It is eventually revealed that Logan Nelson is the new Jigsaw Killer, and that he recreated the game he was once part of using new victims. At the end of the film, Logan abducts corrupt detective Brad Halloran and kills him as revenge for him being indirectly responsible for the death of Logan's wife. Having successfully framed Halloran as the killer, Logan escapes and is free to continue Jigsaw's work.

Spiral takes place an unknown amount of time after John's death, as another Jigsaw copycat creates their own games to punish corrupt police officers and detectives. The case is investigated by Detective Zeke Banks, who eventually discovers that his new partner, Detective William Schenk, is the killer. Schenk kidnaps Banks' father Marcus, who is largely responsible for the corruption in the police department, and reveals that his own father was killed by a dirty cop and that he hopes to recruit Banks as a partner in cleansing the department of corruption. Banks is then forced to choose between killing Schenk or saving his father; he manages to rescue Marcus, but Schenk calls a SWAT team and makes it appear that Marcus is the aggressor and is holding a gun. Schenk then escapes as the SWAT team restrains Banks and shoots Marcus to death.

Recurring elements

Billy

Billy is a puppet resembling a ventriloquist's dummy, sometimes seen riding a tricycle, that has appeared throughout the films and has become a type of mascot for the series. It is used by the Jigsaw Killer to communicate with his victims by delivering televised messages or occasionally in person to describe details of the sadistic traps and the means by which the victims could survive. Viewers have sometimes incorrectly identified the puppet itself as Jigsaw, because of its presence and connection to the killer.

Age and use of the puppet over the course of the films necessitated its reconstruction. According to Wan, the original puppet's face for Saw involved clay, papier-mâché, and black ping-pong balls with the irises painted in for the eyes, but in later films more sophisticated construction included waterjet-cut foam for the body and remote-controlled animatronics.

The endurance and popularity of the franchise has resulted in the production of Billy merchandise, as well as references in other media and its use in promotions for the films.

"Hello Zepp"

"Hello Zepp" is a piece of instrumental music that was originally composed by Charlie Clouser for the first film in the series. In Saw, the implied villain, Zep Hindle, is revealed to actually be a victim of the Jigsaw Killer. (The character's name in the script is spelled "Zep", whereas the music titles are spelled "Zepp" as a reference to the popular 80s band Zapp.) As the series continued, the piece was reused in every film as a leitmotif, often being renamed and remixed to accommodate the changing situations and characters. The music was used in every Saw ending, usually during the revealing of plot revelations and twists which Saw films often use and it serves as the main theme tune for the whole films.

Traps
An important component of each film is the variety of (usually mechanical in form) traps Jigsaw and his apprentices use on their captives to communicate his message.

According to David Hackl, all of the traps are real objects, and not CGI. They were designed to look horrific but ultimately be safe for the actors in them. Writer Marcus Dunstan said: "It's built to function there on the day", and added: "It works. So if there's a scalping chair—there really was a chair with working gears to grind and pull your scalp back." The most potentially dangerous item was a "water box" used in Saw V, in which one of the actors (Scott Patterson, as Peter Strahm) had to keep his head submerged as long as possible. Another element of the traps is that Hackl desired a specific look of rust and menace, but he also wanted them to have a type of beauty about them.

Reception

Box office performance

Saw grossed $18.2 million its opening weekend and had become Lionsgate's second-best opening, after Fahrenheit 9/11  (2004). Saw went on to gross  worldwide, and is the third-lowest-grossing film in the series after Jigsaw and Saw VI. At the time, it became the most profitable horror film after Scream (1996). It is the seventh-highest-grossing Halloween opening weekend. Saw II opened at number one with $31.7 million, and set a Lionsgate Halloween opening weekend record and is also the third-highest-grossing Halloween opener. It became at the time, the widest release in Lionsgate history and one of the best opening weekends for a horror sequel. It is Lionsgate's fourth-highest-grossing film in the United States and Canada. Saw III placed first by grossing $33.6 million its opening weekend, making it the biggest Halloween debut ever and at the time, Lionsgate's highest-opening weekend. It is the highest-grossing film in the series worldwide. It has the highest-grossing weekend in the series and also Lionsgate's fifth-highest-grossing film in the United States and Canada.

Saw IV premiered at number one with $32.1 million making it the second-best Halloween weekend opener. In Saw Vs opening weekend it placed second, being beat by High School Musical 3: Senior Year, and made $30.1 million. It is Lionsgate's tenth-highest-grossing film. Saw VI opened in second place behind Paranormal Activity to $14.1 million, which is the lowest of all the Saw films worldwide. It is also the lowest-grossing film in the series. Saw 3D placed first grossing $22.5 million its opening weekend, with 92% of tickets coming from more than 2,100 3D-equipped locations. It had the fifth-best opening weekend in the Saw series. It is the most successful film in the franchise since Saw IV. In the United States and Canada, Jigsaw was released alongside Thank You for Your Service and Suburbicon, and is projected to gross around $20 million from 2,941 theaters in its opening weekend. It made $1.6 million from Thursday night previews at 2,400 theaters, just below the $1.7 million Saw 3D made from midnight screenings seven years prior, and $7.2 million on its first day. It went on to open to $16.64 million, finishing first at the box office but marking the second lowest debut of the franchise. In its second weekend the film dropped 61% to $6.56 million, finishing third behind newcomers Thor: Ragnarok and A Bad Moms Christmas. In its third weekend, the film dropped another 47% and made $3.43 million, finishing fifth.

The Saw series, when compared to other top-grossing American horror franchises - Alien vs. Predator, Candyman, Child's Play, The Conjuring, The Exorcist, The Evil Dead, Final Destination, Friday the 13th, Godzilla, Halloween, Hannibal Lecter, Hellraiser, I Know What You Did Last Summer, Jaws, A Nightmare on Elm Street, The Omen, Paranormal Activity, Psycho, The Purge, Scream, and The Texas Chainsaw Massacre - with figures adjusted for 2011 inflation, is the fifth-highest-grossing horror franchise in the United States and Canada at $457.4 million. This list is topped by Friday the 13th at $687.1 million, followed by the Nightmare on Elm Street series with $592.8 million, with the Hannibal Lecter film series closely behind with $588.7 million. Then comes Halloween with $557.5 million, and trailing behind the Saw franchise are the Scream series with $442.9 million, The Texas Chainsaw Massacre with $304.6 million, and lastly the Child's Play film series with approximately $203 million.

The box office numbers, unadjusted for inflation are as follows:

Critical and public response
On IGN's list of the top twenty-five film franchises of all time, the Saw series ranked as 25th.

Other media

Video games
Japanese video game company Konami currently owns the rights to the Saw interactive video game property. Konami stated in mid-2009 that they wanted to make Saw a series of video games to supplement the films. They also wish to make Saw their next big survival horror franchise next to their other property, Silent Hill. They stated that because Saw focuses on visual intensity and Silent Hill focuses on psychological terror, both could exist in the video game industry without directly competing against each other.

The first game in the series, Saw, set between the first and second film in the series, was initially released on October 6, 2009, with a sequel Saw II: Flesh & Blood, released on October 19, 2010, for the Xbox 360 and PlayStation 3, ten days before the release of the seventh film, Saw 3D.

David Tapp and Amanda Young were released as part of the downloadable Saw Chapter for the video game Dead by Daylight.

A bundle featuring an operator dressed up as Billy the Puppet was released in Call of Duty: Warzone as part of the Haunting of Verdansk Halloween event.

Comic books
Saw: Rebirth, a comic book prequel to the original film released to promote Saw II. Its canonicity was later contradicted by events in Saw IV. It is, however, the first canonical appearance of Jigsaw's wife, Jill, who was later introduced into the film series in Saw III and established still-canonical elements of Jigsaw's backstory (an engineer who is dying from brain cancer).

Theme park attractions

 "Saw – The Ride" is a Gerstlauer Euro-Fighter roller coaster themed around the franchise, which opened on March 13, 2009, at Thorpe Park in the United Kingdom. It features an enclosed dark ride section with special effects, before traveling outside and climbing a 100-foot vertical lift hill into a steep 100-degree beyond-vertical drop passing under large rotating saw blades.
 Thorpe Park opened a temporary Saw attraction called "Saw — Movie Bites" for their 2009 Fright Nights event.
 Thorpe Park added a permanent, year-round live action horror maze themed around the Saw movies. Named "Saw: Alive", it opened at the start of the 2010 season, and featured six scenes representing one iconic trap from each movie to date, but is no longer a permanent year-round attraction, and it only operated during Thorpe Park's Halloween event called Fright Nights. Until the mazes final year, in 2018, the park announced that it would close permanently and not return for the 2019 event.
 "Saw: Game Over" was a 2009 Horror maze made by Universal Studios for Halloween Horror Nights, based on characters, traps and scenes from the films. At the Universal Studios Hollywood rendition of Horror Nights it was titled Saw: Game Over, while at the Universal Studios Florida rendition, it was simply titled Saw.
 "Saw", a themed haunted house, operated during the month of October at Fright Dome, Circus Circus Las Vegas. It featured interactive, handcrafted replicas of the "games" set by Jigsaw. It was introduced in 2009 and partnered with Lionsgate and Twisted Pictures.
 In 2018, Saw themed escape room called "Saw Escape Las Vegas" was made by the creators of Fright Dome. It is officially licensed by LionsGate and is also located in the city of Las Vegas in Nevada, USA as the name suggests.
 In 2010, "Halloween Fright Nights" at Warner Bros. Movie World featured a maze created by Sudden Impact Entertainment, featuring characters, traps and scenes from the films. The maze was simply titled "Saw Maze".
 "Saw Haunted Attraction" was a maze at the Brea Plaza Shopping Center in 2008 created by Sinister Pointe Haunted Attractions.
 "SAWMANIA" was a fan event in New York. Eventgoers were able to meet actors and directors, and view props used in the films.

Toys
Toys include Billy the Puppet dolls, Jigsaw figurines and costumes, and Pig mask figurines and masks.

See also

 Splatter film

Notes

References

External links

 
 
 Saw at Box Office Mojo

 
Film franchises introduced in 2004
Horror film franchises
Lionsgate franchises
Splatterpunk
Fiction about death games
2000s English-language films
2010s English-language films
2020s English-language films